Dasmapura  is a village in the southern state of Karnataka, India.

See also
 Bellary
 Districts of Karnataka

References

External links
 http://Bellary.nic.in/

Villages in Bellary district